Silver Ball Gardens was an amusement arcade in Berkeley, California. It was founded by Byron Won in 1973 and located in a second-story loft at 2518-A Durant Avenue. Silver Ball Gardens was decorated with interior murals by Berkeley artist Eugene Legend, and a large exterior mural by Berkeley artist Bobby Vitaliano.

In the late 1970s, Silver Ball Gardens was purchased by Masayoshi Son and Hong Lu, two entrepreneurs running an arcade-game importing business in Berkeley. Son would go on to found SoftBank Group in 1981, and Lu to found UTStarcom in 1995.

See also 

 Glossary of pinball terms
 Golden age of arcade video games
 History of video games
 List of arcade video games
 List of pinball machines
 List of pinball manufacturers

References

External links 
 Internet Pinball Database Searchable database of pinball machines

 Pinballhistory.com Pictures and history of pinball machines

Pinball
Single-player games